The German city of Hamburg is the most populous city in the European Union which is not a national capital. The city contains an approximate 1.8 million people.

The figures since 1970 are published by the Statistical Office for Hamburg and Schleswig Holstein, based on the information of several state authorities.

Historic population data
Hamburg was by far the most populated German City after the Thirty Years' War. Due to its , which had been finished 1625, the city was never conquered and many people fled into it.

Population
On December 31, 2006 there were 1,754,182 registered people living in Hamburg (up from 1,652,363 in 1990).

There were 856,132 males and 898,050 females in Hamburg. For every 1,000 males there were 1,049 females. In 2006 there were 16,089 births in Hamburg, of which 33.1% were given by unmarried women, 6,921 marriages and 4,583 divorces. In 2006, 198 registered partnerships took place at the civil registration office (Standesamt). 40 partnerships were dissolved by court order since 2001. The age distribution was 15.7% under the age of 18, and 18.8% were 65 or older. In 2006, there were 257,060 foreign residents were living in Hamburg (14.8% of the population). The largest group being Turkish nationals at 58,154 (22.6% of foreign residents ), followed by 20,743 Polish nationals. 4,046 people were from the United Kingdom and 4,369 were from the United States. According to GTZ, 22,000 immigrants living in Hamburg are from Afghanistan, thus forming the largest Afghan community in Germany and Europe.

After a descent of the population in the 1970s, Hamburg has constantly grown since 1999. However, the number of deaths were greater than the number of births until 2010.

Households

There were 915,319 women and 945,440 men in Hamburg. For every 1,000 males, there were 1,033 females. In 2015, there were 19,768 births in Hamburg (of which 38.3% were to unmarried women); 6422 marriages and 3190 divorces, and 17,565 deaths. The age distribution was 16.1% under the age of 18, and 18.3% were 65 or older. 356 People in Hamburg were over the age of 100.

According to the Statistical Office of the State of Hamburg, the number of people with a migrant background is at 34% (631,246). Immigrants come from 180 different countries. 5891 people have acquired German citizenship in 2016.

In 2016, there were 1,021,666 households, of which 17.8% had children under the age of 18; 54.4% of households were made up of singles. 25.6% of households with children were single parent households. The average household size was 1.8.

Quarters and boroughs
In 2008 Wandsbek was the most populous borough in Hamburg. Until February 2008 the Harburg borough was the second-most. Through the change of the borders in Hamburg, the quarter Wilhelmsburg merged into Hamburg-Mitte, and Hamburg-Mitte became the second-most populous borough.

Ethnic groups
In 2008 Hamburg had the highest Afghan diasporic population of any city in the continent, with 7,000 German citizens of Afghan origin and 14,000 other residents of Afghan origin. The city has therefore been nicknamed by some as Little Kabul. Immigration began with the start of the Soviet–Afghan War in 1979 and additional immigration came after its end. Due to the differing origins and political affiliations of the emigrés,  et al. wrote in Der Spiegel that "Hamburg's Afghan community was relatively loose-knit and was rarely perceived as an ethnic group, partly because these immigrants had been so deeply divided at home that there was little left to unite them as a community abroad." Therefore the residents focused internally on their own families and keeping them together. Afghan Museum was in Hamburg.

In 1963 there were 800 Japanese people in Hamburg, including 50 children. In 1985 the city had a Japanese community, though it was not the largest in Germany as by then Düsseldorf had the largest one. Japanese School in Hamburg is in nearby Halstenbek.

Sexual orientation

The Hamburg Institute for Sexual Research conducted a survey over the sexual behavior of young people in 1970, and repeated it in 1990. Whereas in 1970 18% of the boys aged 16 and 17 reported to have had at least one same-sex sexual experience, the number had dropped to 2% by 1990. "Ever since homosexuality became publicly argued to be an innate sexual orientation, boys' fear of being seen as gay has, if anything, increased," the director of the institute, Volkmar Sigusch, suggested in a 1998 article for a German medical journal.

See also
Demographics of Berlin
Demographics of Cologne
Demographics of Munich

Notes

References

Hamburg
History of Hamburg
Hamburg